The Canis Major Overdensity (CMa Overdensity) or Canis Major Dwarf Galaxy (CMa Dwarf) is a disputed dwarf irregular galaxy in the Local Group, located in the same part of the sky as the constellation Canis Major.

The supposed small galaxy contains a relatively high percentage of red giants and is thought to contain an estimated one billion stars in all.

It has a roughly elliptical shape and is thought to contain as many stars as the Sagittarius Dwarf Elliptical Galaxy, the previous contender for closest galaxy to the Earth's location in the Milky Way, though later studies disputed this conclusion.

Discovery

The existence of a strong elliptical-shaped stellar overdensity was reported in November 2003 by an international team of French, Italian, British and Australian astronomers, who claimed their study pointed to a newly discovered dwarf galaxy: the Canis Major Dwarf Galaxy.

The team of astronomers that discovered it was collaborating on analysis of data from the Two-Micron All Sky Survey (2MASS), a comprehensive survey of the sky in infrared light, which is not blocked by gas and dust as severely as visible light.  Because of this technique, scientists were able to detect a very significant overdensity of class M giant stars in a part of the sky occupied by the Canis Major constellation, along with several other related structures composed of this type of star, two of which form broad, faint arcs.

Characteristics

Some astronomers believe that the CMa overdensity is a dwarf galaxy in the process of being pulled apart by the gravitational field of the more massive Milky Way galaxy. The main body of the CMa is extremely degraded. Tidal disruption causes a filament of stars to trail behind it as it orbits the Milky Way, forming a complex ringlike structure, sometimes referred to as the Monoceros Ring, which wraps around the Milky Way three times. The stream of stars was discovered in the early 21st century by astronomers conducting the Sloan Digital Sky Survey. It was in the course of investigating this ring of stars, and a closely spaced group of globular clusters similar to those associated with the Sagittarius Dwarf Elliptical Galaxy, that the CMa was discovered.

Globular clusters thought to be associated with the CMa include NGC 1851, NGC 1904, NGC 2298 and NGC 2808, all of which may have been part of the galaxy's globular cluster system before accreting into the Milky Way. NGC 1261 is another nearby cluster, but its velocity differs enough to make its relationship to the system unclear. Additionally, Dolidze 25 and H18 are open clusters that may have formed when the dwarf galaxy perturbed material in the galactic disk, stimulating star formation.

The discovery of the CMa and subsequent analysis of the stars associated with it has provided some support for the current theory that galaxies may grow in size by swallowing their smaller neighbors. Martin et al. believe that the preponderance of evidence points to the accretion of a small satellite galaxy of the Milky Way which was orbiting roughly in the plane of the galactic disk.

Dispute

Several studies cast doubts on the true nature of this overdensity. Some research suggests that the trail of stars is actually part of the warped galactic thin disk and thick disk population and not a result of the collision of the Milky Way with a dwarf spheroidal galaxy. Investigation of the area in 2009 yielded only ten RR Lyrae variable stars which is consistent with the Milky Way's halo and thick disk populations rather than a separate dwarf spheroidal galaxy.

In fiction
British science fiction writer Stephen Baxter included the Canis Major Overdensity in his novella "Mayflower II" as the destination of the eponymous starship.

See also
 Messier 79
 Galaxy formation and evolution

References

External links
 
 

 
Dwarf irregular galaxies
Local Group
Milky Way Subgroup
Canis Major
20031101
5065047